Zendaneh (also Romanized as Zendāneh) is a village in Yeylaqi-ye Ardeh Rural District, Pareh Sar District, Rezvanshahr County, Gilan Province, Iran. At the 2016 census, its population was 137, in 47 families.

References 

Populated places in Rezvanshahr County